This is the discography of Danish dance duo Infernal consisting of band members Lina Rafn (pictured), Paw Lagermann, and ex-band member Søren Haahr, who left the band after the release of their debut album Infernal Affairs in 1998. Their first single "Sorti de L'enfer" managed to reach the top 20 in the Danish Singles Chart, and following this success, the band have released a further three studio albums (one of which, From Paris to Berlin, reached the number one spot in Denmark), one remix album and an additional twenty-three singles, seven of which were worldwide hits.

All of Infernal's singles released in their home country have reached the top 20 in the singles chart. "From Paris to Berlin" is widely recognised to be Infernal's signature song, as it was the song that launched them into many other markets such as the United Kingdom, the United States and Australia, as well as a lot of other European countries. On May 7, 2009, Infernal added the iShop to their website, which enables anyone in the world to buy their music in physical format (CD), as well as band merchandise, as they deliver worldwide. In addition, members of Klicktrack can also download Infernal's singles and albums directly from the band's website, in the format; MP3 320kbp/s.

Albums

Studio albums

Notes

A Waiting for Daylight was re-released in 2001 under the title Muzaik, which features new songs and new editions of previously released songs. It peaked at number 17 on the Danish Albums Chart.

Extended plays

Remix albums

Compilation albums

Singles

 (*) The chart positions are based on the Download Top-20 chart in Denmark, which is based on digital sales.

As a Featured Artist

Music videos

Other appearances

References

Discographies of Danish artists
Pop music group discographies